Maya Vladimirovna Kristalinskaya (24 February 1932, Moscow  – 19 June 1985, Moscow) was a Soviet-Russian singer.

In 1957 she performed at the 6th World Festival of Youth and Students in Moscow with an amateur ensemble under the direction of Yury Saulsky and was awarded a Laureate prize. Later she started performing independently. Wide popularity came to her starting in the early 1960s when she recorded the song "Dva Berega" ("We are Two Banks of the Same River") from the 1959 movie Zhazhda. The vinyl recording of the song sold 7 million copies. Kristalinskaya was the original performer of the song "Nezhnost'" (1966) which is considered the epitome of her singing talent. She was bestowed the title of Meritorious Artist of the RSFSR in 1974. In 2002, Kristalinskaya got a star posthumously on the Star Square in Moscow.

References

External links
 Песни Майи Кристалинской
 В песне жизнь моя

1932 births
1985 deaths
Soviet women singers
Honored Artists of the RSFSR
Moscow Aviation Institute alumni
Soviet Jews
Deaths from cancer in Russia
Deaths from lymphoma